Coleophora linoplecta is a moth of the family Coleophoridae. It is found in Egypt.

References

linoplecta
Endemic fauna of Egypt
Moths of Africa
Moths described in 1924